Lynda Worthaisong is an Australian diplomat who served as Ambassador to Laos from 2011 to 2014.  she serves as assistant secretary for the Department of Foreign Affairs and Trade on the Myanmar Taskforce.

References

Australian women ambassadors
Ambassadors of Australia to Laos
Year of birth missing (living people)
Living people